Disodium guanylate, also known as sodium 5'-guanylate and disodium 5'-guanylate, is a natural sodium salt of the flavor enhancing nucleotide guanosine monophosphate (GMP). Disodium guanylate is a food additive with the E number E627. It is commonly used in conjunction with glutamic acid.

As it is a fairly expensive additive, it is not used independently of glutamic acid; if disodium guanylate is present in a list of ingredients but MSG does not appear to be, it is likely that glutamic acid is provided as part of another ingredient such as a processed soy protein complex. It is often added to foods in conjunction with disodium inosinate; the combination is known as disodium 5'-ribonucleotides.

Disodium guanylate is produced from dried seaweed and is often added to instant noodles, potato chips and other snacks, savory rice, tinned vegetables, cured meats, and packaged soup.

See also

References

Organic sodium salts
Nucleotides
Flavor enhancers
E-number additives